Lake Ralphine is a reservoir in Howarth Memorial Park in the city of Santa Rosa, in the U.S. state of California.

Fishing
The California Department of Fish and Wildlife stocks the lake annually with trout of catchable size.  Other fishes found in the lake include bass, bluegill, and catfish.

History
The lake is formed by an earthen dam which dates back to 1882. It was built by Colonel Mark Lindsay McDonald and named after his wife.  In 1947 it was purchased by the City of Santa Rosa.

Access
The lake is encircled by trails (Eagle Scout Trail and Old Fisherman's Trail) which connect to the Howarth Park parking lot off of Summerfield Road.  Horses and motorized vehicles are not allowed on these trails.

In season, kayaks, paddle boats, canoes, rowboats, and sailboats are available for rent, and there is a launch ramp for private boats.

See also
List of lakes in California
List of lakes in the San Francisco Bay Area
List of reservoirs and dams in California
Santa Rosa Creek Reservoir

References

Ralphine
Geography of Santa Rosa, California
Infrastructure completed in 1882
Ralphine
Ralphine